The following is a list of notable people who converted to Christianity from a different religion or no religion. This article addresses only past voluntary professions of faith by the individuals listed, and is not intended to address ethnic, cultural, or other considerations such as Marriage. Certain people listed here may be lapsed or former converts, or their current religious identity may be ambiguous, uncertain or disputed. Such cases are noted in their list entries.

From major religions
List of converts to Christianity from nontheism
List of converts to Christianity from Buddhism
List of converts to Christianity from Confucianism
List of converts to Christianity from Hinduism
List of converts to Christianity from Islam
List of converts to Christianity from Judaism
List of converts to Christianity from Paganism
List of converts to Christianity from Sikhism

Baha'i Faith 
 John Ford Coley — American artist and author.

Cao Dai
 Phan Thị Kim Phúc — subject of a Pulitzer Prize winning photograph by "Nick" Ut, she now heads a fund for children victims of war.

Druze faith 
 Abi-Lamma clan — prominent noble Levantine family and clan, converted from the Druze faith to Christianity.
 Khazen family — prominent noble Levantine family and clan based in Keserwan District, they converted to the Maronite Church.
 Selwa Roosevelt — Chief of Protocol of the United States for almost seven years from 1982-1989—longer than anyone has ever served in that position, she is from Lebanese Druze background, and converted to Methodism.
 Mohamed Alí Seineldín — Lebanese Argentine army colonel, he converted from Druzism to Roman Catholicism during his youth.
 Nada Nadim Prouty — Lebanese former intelligence professional, She was born into the Druze faith, later in life, she converted to Catholicism.

Manichaeism
 St. Augustine of Hippo — early Christian theologian and philosopher.

Rastafarian
 Bob Marley — Jamaican reggae singer and musician

Zoroastrianism
Mar Abba I — Metropolitan bishop and saint of the Assyrian Church of the East
Anastasius of Persia — was originally a Zoroastrian soldier in the Sasanian army, later converted to Christianity.
Babowai — was Catholicos of Seleucia-Ctesiphon and Patriarch of the Church of the East from 457 to 484, during the reign of the Sassanid King Peroz I.
Bademus —  was a rich, noble citizen from Persia, who founded a monastery nearby.
Behnam, Sarah, and the Forty Martyrs — were 4th-century Christians who suffered martyrdom during the reign of Shapur II.
Christina of Persia — was a Sasanian Persian noblewoman and Christian martyr.
Nadir Dinshaw — was a British Parsi philanthropist, businessman and accountant, he converted from Zoroastrianism to Christianity in the early 1960s.
Shapurji Edalji — probably the first person from South Asia to be made the vicar of an English parish.
Eustathius of Mtskheta — was an Orthodox Christian saint, executed for his apostasy from Zoroastrianism by the Sasanian military authorities in Caucasian Iberia.
George of Izla — was an East Syriac martyr, theologian and interpreter.
Golinduch — was a noble Persian lady, She converted from Zoroastrianism to Christianity in the reign of Khosrau I.
Gregory the Commander — was a Sasanian military leader from the House of Mihran, who converted from Zoroastrianism to Christianity.
Varaz Grigor — was the Mihranid king of Caucasian Albania from 628 until his death in 638.
Daisy Irani — an Indian actress in Hindi and Telugu language films.
Ishoʿsabran — was a Persian Zoroastrian convert to Christianity who was martyred in the Sasanian Empire in 620 or 621.
Javanshir — was the prince of Caucasian Albania from 637 to 680, hailing from the region of Gardman.
Joseph Hazzaya — was an 8th-century Syriac Christian writer, ascetic and mystic.
Miles — was the bishop of Susa in Sasanian Persia from before 315 until his martyrdom in 340 or 341.
Mirian III of Iberia — was a king of Iberia or Kartli.
Niketas the Persian — was a 7th-century Byzantine officer.
Peroz — was king of Gogarene and Gardman, ruling from 330 to 361. He converted to Christianity during his rule in Caucasus.
Piran Gushnasp —  he was appointed as the new governor (marzban) of Iberia. Between 540-542 he converted to Christianity.
Razhden the Protomartyr — was a 5th-century Persian nobleman in the service of the Georgian king Vakhtang I of Iberia and a convert to Christianity who was executed by the Sassanid military in Iberia.
Sagdukht — was a 5th-century queen consort of Iberia.
Salome of Armenia — was an Armenian princess.
Sinharib — was an Assyrian king who controlled Nineveh in the fourth century AD.
Sultana Mahdokht — was the daughter of Pholar, the Prince of Dorsas.
Theophobos — was an Iranian commander of the Khurramites who converted to Christianity.
Tiridates III of Armenia — he proclaimed Christianity as the state religion of Armenia in 301, making the Armenian kingdom the first state to embrace Christianity officially.
Yazdin — was an influential Iranian aristocrat.

Yezidism
 Zarifa Pashaevna Mgoyan — Russian pop singer, model and actress convert to Eastern Orthodoxy after marriage.

Satanism
 Jason Massey — American murderer
 Sean Sellers — American murderer.

Skepticism
 Chip Ingram — American author and pastor of Venture Christian Church in Los Gatos, California.

Undetermined
 Kim Dae-jung — President of South Korea from 1998 to 2003, and the 2000 Nobel Peace Prize recipient.
 Tony Fontane — popular recording artist in the 1940s and 1950s
 Wernher von Braun (1912-1977) — German aerospace engineer and space architect considered a "father of rocket science". Von Braun's religious conversion occurred in 1946 after he visited a church in Texas.
 René Girard (1923-2015) — philosophical anthropologist
 William Onyeabor — Nigerian funk musician.
 Barbara Jones — Jamaican singer who after becoming a Christian gave up her secular career and released four Gospel albums.
 Gloria Gaynor — American singer, best known for her disco era hits, notably "I Will Survive". After what she referred to as a sinful lifestyle, and a search in different faiths, she became a Christian and rejected several things from her former musical career.
 Tony Orlando — American producer who reached fame as the lead singer of the group Tony Orlando and Dawn in the early 1970s. Interviewed on The 700 Club, he explained that he became a Christian in 1978, after life struggles.
 Lou Gramm — lead singer of 80's band Foreigner. He struggled with sex, drugs and rock n'roll, and in 1992, after having completed a stint in a rehab center, he became a born again Christian. After surviving a brain tumour, he released a Christian rock album The Lou Gram Band (2009).
 Lord Kenya — pioneer of Ghanaian Hiplife and multiple award-winning musician who in 2010 became a Christian after visiting a Church where he said he had an experience with the Holy Spirit and a warning of repentance. He changed his life direction and became an evangelist under his real name Abraham Philip Akpor Kojo Kenya.
 Nicko McBrain — drummer of heavy metal band Iron Maiden.
 Jin Au-Yeung — Chinese-American hip hop rapper, songwriter  and actor. Became a born again Christian in 2008.
 Spencer Chamberlain — lead vocalist of the Christian metalcore band Underoath, was not raised in a religious home.
 Dave Mustaine — former lead guitarist of Metallica and co-founder and lead guitarist of Megadeth. Though raised as a Jehovah Witness, he left religion early in his youth and later practiced satanism and occult practices. In 2002 he became a born-again Christian.
 Kunle Ajayi — Nigerian saxophonist and veteran of Gospel music in his country. He became a Christian when he was in High School. Later, along with his musical career, he also became a Pastor.
 Abraham Laboriel — prominent Mexican bassist who has participated in over 5,000 studio albums along with international musicians. He became a Christian and recorded several Gospel albums and he has continued to play along with Christian and secular musicians.
 G.E.M. — notable Hong Kong singer who was baptized and became a Christian in 2011.
 Vanity — former front woman of Vanity 6 who after becoming a Christian renounced her stage name and music and started to preach in different parts of the U.S.

See also
Conversion to Christianity
 List of people by belief

Notes and references

 
Converts
Christianity